"Flannan Isle" is an English language poem by Wilfrid Wilson Gibson, first published in 1912.  It refers to a mysterious incident that occurred on the Flannan Isles in 1900, when three lighthouse-keepers disappeared without explanation.

Text
The poem begins:

The remaining stanzas record the increasing tension of the relief party as they search the lighthouse and island, finding no sign of life but three strange birds that plunge from sight. At the ending, conscious of Flannan Isle's history of unexplained tragedies:

In popular culture
The poem "Flannan Isle" is quoted by Tom Baker as the Doctor at the end of the Doctor Who story Horror of Fang Rock, which was set on a lighthouse and involved an alien explanation for the tragedy that befell the three keepers there and survivors of a shipwreck.

For the 1994 album Chansons des mers froides (Songs from the Cold Seas), French producer Hector Zazou adapted an extract of the poem "Flannan Isle" as a song entitled "The Lighthouse". Lead vocals were performed by Siouxsie Sioux of Siouxsie and the Banshees, and backing vocals were provided by a female Nanai shaman.

The Genesis song "The Mystery of Flannan Isle Lighthouse" (on Archive 1967-75) is based on the incident as is the opera The Lighthouse by Peter Maxwell Davies.

The novel Some Strange Scent of Death by Angela J. Elliott takes its name from a line in the poem and tells of the disappearance of the lighthouse keepers.

The main story of the video game Dark Fall II: Lights Out contains characters and locations related to the incident.

2018 Scottish thriller film The Vanishing is set in the Flannan Isles.

References

Edition

External links
 Text of Flannan Isle

English poems
1912 poems